Aéro Revue is a French and German aviation magazine published in Brugg, Switzerland. Founded in 1906, it is one of the oldest aviation magazines in the world. In addition, it is one of the largest aviation publications in the country.

History and profile
The magazine was established in 1906. It was first called Bulletin and had two editions; German and French. It is published by Swiss Aviation Media on a monthly basis.

The magazine initially covered articles about ballooning and reported nothing about airplanes. It was previously based in Zurich. In 1926 it was renamed Aero Revue. The same year it became the official media outlet of the Swiss Aero Club.

In 1948 the circulation of Aero Revue was 10,000 copies.

See also
 List of magazines in Switzerland

References

External links
 Official website

1906 establishments in Switzerland
Aviation magazines
German-language magazines
French-language magazines
Magazines established in 1906
Magazines published in Zürich
Mass media in Brugg
Monthly magazines published in Switzerland